Bunești-Averești is a commune in Vaslui County, Western Moldavia, Romania. It is composed of seven villages: Armășeni, Averești (the commune centre), Bunești, Plopi, Podu Oprii, Roșiori and Tăbălăiești.

References

Communes in Vaslui County
Localities in Western Moldavia